The 1920–21 Michigan State Normal Normalites men's basketball team represented the Michigan State Normal School, now Eastern Michigan University, in the 1920–21 NCAA men's basketball season. The team finished with a record of 12–4 and won the Michigan Intercollegiate Athletic Association Championship. The team was led by head coach Elton Rynearson, in his fourth year.

Roster
Osborne – Center
Burrell – Center
Deakin – Right guard
Walker – Right guard
Austin – Left guard
Mackin – Left guard
Williams – Right forward
Hole – Right forward
Wilkshire – Left forward
Crane – Left forward

Schedule

|-
!colspan=9 style="background:#006633; color:#FFFFFF;"| Exhibition

|-
!colspan=9 style="background:#006633; color:#FFFFFF;"| Non-conference regular season

References

Eastern Michigan Eagles men's basketball seasons
Michigan State Normal
1920 in sports in Michigan
1921 in sports in Michigan